Santa Rosa is a corregimiento in Colón District, Colón Province, Panama with a population of 987 as of 2010. Its population as of 1990 was 533; its population as of 2000 was 735.

References

Corregimientos of Colón Province